Christen Gerhart is one of the judges, with Penn & Teller and Jason Latimer, on the magic contest reality television series Wizard Wars on the Syfy channel.

Gerhart is a magician and magic news reporter on a weekly magic-themed web show called Exposé, at theory11.com. She has focused her career on analyzing and understanding the magic world, and is a long-standing member of the Magic Castle.

She is also a telescope operator at Mt. Wilson Observatory and a former NASA Jet Propulsion Lab researcher.

Gerhart and comedian Eden Dranger are the performers on Bitchkraft, an original web series on YouTube featuring female-centric magic.

In April 2015, Gerhart, who is a vegan, launched "A Harmless Project"
to promote cruelty-free, chic fashion.

References

External links
 Official website
 Exposé at theory11.com
 Bitchkraft

American magicians
Female magicians
American Internet celebrities
Living people
1989 births